The tenth generation of the Ford F-Series is a line of pickup trucks produced by Ford from the 1997 to 2004 model years.  The first ground-up redesign of the F-Series since 1980, the tenth generation saw the introduction of an all-new chassis and a completely new body.  In a significant model change, the tenth generation was developed only for the F-150 (and later a light-duty F-250), with the ninth-generation F-250 and F-350 replaced by the all-new Ford Super Duty variant of the F-Series for 1999.

Alongside its all-new body and chassis, the tenth-generation F-150 saw further changes to the F-Series line, including the retirement of the Twin I-Beam front suspension (the first Ford light truck to do so), an entirely new engine lineup, and the addition of a rear door (later two) to SuperCab trucks.  The F-150 again served as the basis for Ford full-size SUVs, as the long-running Ford Bronco was replaced by the five-door Ford Expedition for 1997, with Lincoln-Mercury introducing the Lincoln Navigator for 1998.  For 2002, Lincoln-Mercury marketed its own version of the F-Series, introducing the Lincoln Blackwood as the first Lincoln pickup truck.

Through its production, the model line was assembled by multiple Ford facilities in the United States, Canada, and Mexico; after its replacement in 2004, this generation was rebranded as the Ford Lobo in Mexico from 2004 to 2010 (when it was replaced by the twelfth-generation F-150).

Development 
In late 1989, during mid-stage development of a facelift due in late 1991 for model year 1992, Ford commenced the PN-96 program on a new truck platform and designated Thomas Baughman as chief engineer. In mid-1990, Andrew Jacobson was designated as design director for the PN-96 truck program. By 1991, designers had developed clay models indicative of car-like styling, based on a new design theme.

Despite the disapproval from focus groups towards "softer" styling during 1991 and 1992 in concept design clinics, Ford management backed the "aero" design philosophy. The end result by Bob Aikins reached in November 1992 and frozen for production in February 1993, took the aero styling further with a rounded nose on the new F-series. The PN-96 mules went into testing 1993, with prototypes running from early 1994. Pilot production began in 1995.

1997–2004 
Being the F-150's first major redesign since late 1979, the redesigned truck went on a nationwide 87-stop tour to Ford plants and the external part suppliers in October 1995, prior to its release. To build anticipation for the redesigned truck, the 1997 model was released in January 1996 with the first ad campaigns airing during Super Bowl XXX. Because of the radical styling, Ford predicted from marketing clinics that traditional truck buyers would not receive the radical and car-like 1997 well, so it continued to produce and sell the previous 1996 model alongside the redesigned 1997 model for a few months.

A wide variety of body options were available: the 2-3 passenger 2-door regular cab and the 5-6 passenger 3-door SuperCab (4-door after 1999 MY),  and  beds, and a choice of Styleside or Flareside beds on  models. A new Lightning was introduced in March 1999, and Harley-Davidson and King Ranch editions were also created for the 2000 and 2001 model years, respectively. In 2000, the SuperCrew cab was introduced with four full-size doors for the 2001 model year. A Sport 4x4 model was introduced in 1999. It featured the 5.4L Triton V8 and color-matched bumpers and mirror housings, and was available in regular cab and SuperCab in four colors: white, red, black, and silver. In 2002, an FX4 model was introduced, which came with skid plates, a carbon steel frame, Rancho shock absorbers, and unique 17" aluminum wheels along with more standard features that were optional on XLT. In 2003, a sporty STX trim package was introduced, aimed at younger truck buyers. The STX package featured color-keyed front/rear bumpers along with clear lens headlights and integrated round fog lamps. The package also featured chrome step rails, 17" chrome wheels, and a Kenwood Z828 stereo was installed in place of the standard Ford radio. Also in 2003, a special trim package "Heritage Edition" version with special badging was produced to mark the 100th anniversary of Ford trucks, available only in the 139-inch wheelbase SuperCab model.

Sales of the F-150 surged in the tenth generation from 750,000 to over 900,000 in 2001 as products from General Motors and Chrysler lagged. Ford's sales dropped, however, for the final years of this generation as the redesigned Dodge Ram and refreshed Chevrolet Silverado were released.

The new F-150 was Motor Trend magazine's Truck of the Year in 1997.  A minor facelift was introduced September 1998, with minor interior updates for 1999 models including a revised instrument cluster and a new door panel design to incorporate the 4th additional door. In February 2000, the SuperCrew was added to the lineup early in the 2001 MY (Model Year), entering production on December 13, 1999. Ford also manufactured a limited run of "Heritage" (differentiated from the 2003 "Heritage Edition") F-150s of the 2003 body style to August 2004 as 2004 models to finish out production. The only change for 2004 models also had fully amber turn signal lenses on the headlamps, the SuperCrew body style was dropped, and the Lariat trim was dropped, leaving only XL and XLT.

This generation of F-150 was sold in Mexico alongside the new 11th generation F-Series through 2008. It was only available as a Regular Cab and in XL trim, while the newer model was available in more trims, SuperCab and SuperCrew configurations and the new model was badged as Lobo, while the older model retained the F-150 name.

Powertrain
A new lineup of improved efficiency engines were offered beginning for 1997. A 4.2 L OHV V6, based on Ford's 3.8 L Essex V6, replaced the 4.9 L OHV I6, while 4.6 and 5.4 liter SOHC V8s replaced the 5.0 and 5.8 liter OHV V8s. The 4.6 and 5.4 liter V8s were marketed under the name Triton and mark the first use of Ford's Modular Single Overhead Cam (SOHC) engines in the F-series pickups. Ford's own 8.8 IFS replaced the Dana 44 front end, while the Ford 8.8 rear remained. The Ford Sterling 9.75 axle was also optioned in heavy-duty versions. In 2000, the Sterling 10.25 axle became an option.

Engines:

Trim
Standard (1998), Work Series (1999-2000), became a more basic package for the XL in 2001 - Included: Vinyl upholstery, bench seat, manual mirrors, steel wheels, 4-pin trailer wiring, manual windows, an AM/FM stereo with a clock, and a manual transmission.
XL - Included: Chrome bumpers, manual mirrors, styled-steel wheels, polyknit (later, cloth) upholstery, bench seat, manual windows, a manual or automatic transmission, and an AM/FM stereo with a clock (and later, a cassette player).
XLT - Added: aluminum wheels, cloth upholstery, tinted rear windows, cargo box light, tachometer, power windows and locks with automatic driver's side window, an AM/FM stereo with a cassette player (later, a single-CD player) and clock, air conditioning, and later, a leather wrapped steering wheel, an overhead console with compass and garage openers, speed-dependent wipers, and power mirrors.
Lariat - Added: cast aluminum wheels, carpeted floor mats, power mirrors with turn signals, power driver's seat, automatic headlamps, leather trimmed seats, anti-lock brake system, and later, an automatic transmission, an AM/FM stereo with single-CD and cassette players and clock, and a keypad entry.
King Ranch added   leather upholstery, heated seats, captain chairs and a 6-disc CD changer.

Safety
This generation F-150 received two five-star ratings from the National Highway Traffic Safety Administration, in direct contrast to the "Poor" rating by the Insurance Institute for Highway Safety (IIHS) in the frontal offset test,

Ford has found that the cruise control system in many of their trucks could catch fire, because the switch system could corrode over time, overheat and ignite. Ignition was later blamed on spillage from the adjacent master cylinder. On March 5, 2007, Ford recalled 155,000 2003 full-size pickups and full-size SUVs for the defective part. During the previous two years Ford had recalled 5.8 million vehicles in because of the defective cruise control systems in trucks, SUVs and vans. That recall, one of the largest in history, covered vehicles from the 1994–2002 model years.

Variants

F-250 light-duty (1997-1999)

At its January 1996 launch, the 1997 PN96 F-Series was only offered as a F-150; the F-250 and F-350 were produced as 1996 models on the previous-generation chassis.  To bridge the gap between the F-150 and the heavier-duty pickups, a PN96 version of the F-250 light-duty was introduced nearly a year later (though also a 1997 model), slotted between the F-150 and the F-250HD of the previous-generation chassis.  While nearly externally identical to the F-150, the F-250 gained increased load capability from a heavy-duty rear axle and load-leveling rear suspension; the F-250 was distinguished by 7-lug wheels.

The PN-96 F-250 light-duty was marketed from 1997 to 1999, with Ford offering two generations of the vehicle under the same nameplate. For 1999, the F-250HD and F-350 were replaced by the Super Duty F-Series; the suspension components of the PN-96 F-250 continued as a "7700" option package from 2000 to 2003.

SVT Lightning (1999-2004)
The Ford SVT Lightning is a sports/performance version of the F-150, developed by the SVT (Special Vehicle Team) division of Ford. For 1999, the second generation of the Lightning was released using the PN96 platform, after a three-year hiatus of the model line. As with its 1993-1995 predecessor, the Lightning was based on the F-150; all versions were produced with a regular cab, rear-wheel drive, and a  bed length.

While the first-generation Lightning chassis was a hybrid of the F-150 and F-250, to save weight and lower its cost, the second-generation adopted the stock F-150 frame.  To improve handling, while the stock short/long arm front suspension configuration was used, the Lightning was lowered one inch with a 31mm stabilizer bar; the rear solid axle with leaf springs was lowered two inches, using a 23mm stabilizer bar.  Monroe shocks were used from 1999 to 2001; Bilstein shocks were used from 2002 to 2004. In place of the 17-inch wheels of its predecessor, the second-generation Lightning was given 18-inch wheels with Goodyear Eagle F1 directional tires developed for the truck.

The second-generation Lightning was powered by a 5.4 L Triton SOHC V8 equipped with an Eaton M112 supercharger. The supercharged V8 was paired with a 4-speed Ford 4R100 overdrive automatic transmission (shared with the 5.4L V8, 6.8L V10, and 7.3L diesel). From 1999 to 2000, the rear axle ratio was 3.55:1, shortened to 3.73:1 in 2001. The same year, a  aluminum driveshaft replaced a  steel unit.

Following the 2001 drivetrain revisions, Car and Driver magazine tested a Lightning, accelerating from 0- in 5.2 seconds.

During its production, the 1999-2004 was offered in a limited variety of colors.  Initially produced in Bright Red, Black, and White, for 2000, Silver was introduced.  For 2002, True Blue (a very dark blue) was introduced, but was replaced by a lighter Sonic Blue for 2003, along with Dark Shadow Gray.

The Ford SVT Lightning was manufactured by Ford of Canada at its Ontario Truck facility in Oakville, Ontario; it was closed in 2004.  Special features specific to the Lightning included:

 5.4 L 2V Triton Supercharged Intercooled V8 engine
 Modified 4R100 4-speed automatic transmission with OD lockout
 Eaton Detroit Locker Rear Differential
 Auxiliary transmission fluid cooler
 Eaton M112 supercharger
 Engine super cooling system
 Heavy duty battery
 Unique front fascia with integrated, round fog lamps
 Unique upper and lower grilles
 Unique front lower air deflectors
 Unique cab rocker and lower box moldings
 Unique wheels and tires
 4-wheel ABS / 4-wheel disc brakes
 Heavy duty front and rear shock absorbers

Lincoln Blackwood (2002) 

For 2002, the Lincoln-Mercury division of Ford introduced the Lincoln Blackwood, the first pickup truck ever sold by the Lincoln brand.  Brought into production after a positive reception to a 1999 concept vehicle, the Blackwood was a variant of the Ford F-150 SuperCrew introduced for 2001.

Styled with the front fascia of the Lincoln Navigator SUV, the Blackwood diverged from the F-150 in terms of functionality.  In place of a pickup bed, the Blackwood was given a stainless-steel cargo area lined with carpet covered with a power-operated tonneau; the plastic body panels of the pickup bed were styled as black wood with pinstripes.  To match the simulated wood design of the pickup bed, Lincoln offered black as the only body color for the Blackwood.  Sharing its interior with the Navigator, the Blackwood was fitted with four seats (with a center console between the rear seats).

Equipped only with rear-wheel drive, the Blackwood shared its 300 hp 5.4L 32-valve V8 with the Navigator.

References

10th generation
Pickup trucks
Rear-wheel-drive vehicles
All-wheel-drive vehicles
Cars introduced in 1996
2000s cars
Flexible-fuel vehicles
Motor vehicles manufactured in the United States